Lego House may refer to:

 "Lego House", 2011 song by Ed Sheeran
 Lego House (Billund), opened in 2017
 The Lego House, another name for the Lilla Bommen building in Sweden, also known as "The Lipstick"

See also
 James May's Lego House, 2010 book about the house built for Toy Stories